The 2018 SAFF U-15 Women's Championship was the 2nd edition of the SAFF U-15 Women's Championship, an international football competition for women's under-15 national teams organized by SAFF. The tournament was hosted by Bhutan from 9–18 of August, 2018 at Changlimithang Stadium. Six teams from the region took part.

Host selection
A draw for tournament ceremony was held on 7 July 2018 in Motijheel at conference room of Bangladesh Football Federation.

SAFF general secretary Anwarul Haque Helal and BFF general secretary Abu Nayeem Shohag, were among others present on the occasion.

Player eligibility
Players born on or after 1 January 2003 are eligible to compete in the tournament.

Participating nations

Venue

Group stage
All matches were played in Thimphu, Bhutan.
Times listed are UTC+06:00.

Group A

Group B

Bracket

Knockout stage

Semi-finals

Third place match

Final

Awards

Goalscorers

4 Goals

  Shamsunnahai
  Tohura Khatun
  Shilky Devi
  Chandra Bhandhari

3 Goals

  Sajeda Khatun
  Maria Manda
  Sonam Lamho
  Yeshey Bidha
  Sunita Munda

2 Goals 

  Anai Mogini
  Deki Yangdon
  Avika Singh
  Anju
  Lynda Kom
  Thounaojam Kritina Devi
  Sabita Rana Magar
  Rajani Thokar

1 Goal 

  Monika Chakma
  Shamsunnahar
  Akhi Khatun
  Anuching Mogini
  Shaheda Akter Ripa
  Kiran
  Anuska Sherpa

References

2018
2018 in women's association football
2018
2018 in Bhutanese football
August 2018 sports events in Asia
2018 in Asian football
2018 in youth association football